The New Land is a 1972 Swedish film directed and co-written by Jan Troell and starring Max von Sydow, Liv Ullmann, Eddie Axberg, Allan Edwall, Monica Zetterlund, and Pierre Lindstedt. It and its 1971 predecessor, The Emigrants (Utvandrarna), which were produced concurrently, are based on Vilhelm Moberg's The Emigrants, a series of novels about poor Swedes who emigrate from Småland, Sweden, in the mid-19th century and make their home in Minnesota. This film adapts the latter half of the four novels (The Settlers (1956) and The Last Letter Home (1959)), which depict the struggles of the immigrants to establish a settlement in the wilderness and adjust to life in America.

Like The Emigrants, The New Land was nominated for the Academy Award for Best Foreign Language Film. The 1974 American television series The New Land is loosely based on The Emigrants and this film.

Plot
In 1850, Karl Oskar, his wife Kristina, and their three children, along with Karl Oskar's brother Robert and Robert's friend Arvid, have just arrived in what is now known as the Chisago Lakes area in Minnesota after enduring an arduous trip from Sweden. With the family initially sheltering in a shanty, Karl Oskar puts all of his energy and resources into building a more permanent house. He begins clearing the land of the pine trees, and, with the help of Robert, Arvid, and some of their Swedish neighbors, completes a small farmhouse before winter comes. At the housewarming party, the assembled Swedish settlers, which include Danjel, Kristina's uncle, and Ulrika, a woman who has become a very close friend to Kristina, discuss whether they regret emigrating. Kristina, feeling homesick, bursts into tears.

Kristina, aided by Ulrika, gives birth to a son, who she names Danjel after her uncle. Ulrika later marries Pastor Jackson, a friendly Baptist minister who lives in a nearby town. Pious Lutheran neighbors attempt to persuade Kristina and Karl Oskar to shun her due to this, but they refuse.

Robert takes Arvid to seek their fortune in the California Gold Rush. After being gone for several years, he returns, alone, to Karl Oskar's farm and gives Karl Oskar and Kristina a big stack of banknotes. He has always felt that Karl Oskar looks down on him, so he says the money is only a small part of what he got for the gold he found, but, via a series of flashbacks, we learn that his adventure was plagued by a series of misfortunes. After slowly working their way west, Robert and Arvid got lost in the desert when looking for a stray donkey, and Arvid died after drinking poisoned water. Robert was rescued by their Hispanic guide, who brought him to a village in the Sierra Nevada. The guide caught yellow fever, and Robert nursed him, despite being warned of the risk. Before succumbing to his illness, the guide gave Robert a sack of coins. After spending some time on his own in a small town, Robert exchanged the coins for lighter banknotes before heading back to Minnesota. Karl Oskar discovers that Robert has been cheated, as the banknotes are worthless. Robert is distraught and, having refused to seek medical help for a persistent cough, dies a short time later.

In the following years, Karl Oskar becomes an American citizen and tries to volunteer to serve in the Civil War, but he is rejected because he walks with a limp. Kristina, who still misses Sweden, is glad that her husband will not be a soldier and become a murderer. She gives birth to two more children, Ulrika and Frank, after which a doctor advises her that, after so many pregnancies, her insides are torn up and another pregnancy will kill her. Ultimately deciding to disregard the warning and leave her fate in the hands of God, Kristina becomes pregnant again. She suffers several miscarriages, and then falls ill just as the Dakota War of 1862, during which the starving Dakota people rose up and killed hundreds of settlers across Minnesota, erupts. Among the murdered settlers are Uncle Danjel, his eldest son, and his pregnant daughter-in-law. Karl Oskar stays by Kristina's bed as she dies, the uprising is put down, and 38 of the Dakota warriors are subject to a mass execution in Mankato.

Overwhelmed by grief after Kristina's death, Karl Oskar withdraws into solitude as his children grow up and start families of their own. He often visits Kristina's grave overlooking the lake, tending to the plot while, in the distance, hammering sounds can be heard as the other Swedes who have also begun moving into the area in large numbers establish their farms. On Kristina's grave marker, beneath her name, it reads: "We Shall Meet Again".

Karl Oskar dies peacefully in his sleep on 7 December 1890. Because all of his and Kristina's children have forgotten Swedish, a neighbor, Axel J. Andersson, writes a letter to Karl Oskar's sister Lydia back in Sweden to inform her of the death. Included with the letter is a family photograph showing Karl Oskar surrounded by his many children and grandchildren.

Cast

Production

Actress Liv Ullmann said that The New Land was filmed concurrently with The Emigrants over the course of a year. The cast members spent days in the fields to portray farming, particularly for The New Land. Ullmann said that, after three days of this, she began to feel exhausted.

The film was shot at Filmstaden in Stockholm, as well as in Småland and Skåne in Sweden and Wisconsin, Minnesota, and Colorado in the United States, between February 1969 and January 1970. The combined cost of the two films was SEK 7,000,000, making them the most expensive Swedish films produced at the time.

Release
The New Land was released to cinemas in Sweden on 26 February 1972. It was the highest-grossing Swedish film of the year. The film opened in New York City on 26 October 1973.

The Emigrants and The New Land were edited into The Emigrant Saga and aired on television. Their first U.S. home video release was not until February 2016, when The Criterion Collection released both films on DVD and Blu-ray. The films had been frequently requested by customers. In 2016, The New Land was also featured in the Gothenburg Film Festival.

Reception

Critical reception
Writing for The New York Times, Lawrence van Gelder praised the film as "a masterly exercise in film-making", and complimented von Sydow and Ullman. He wrote that, while the film could be "a reunion with old friends" for audiences that had seen The Emigrants, The New Land could also stand alone. Stephen Farber of The New York Times called The New Land "a shattering film", and asserted that "its portrait of the Indians is one of the most interesting ever caught on film". In New York, Judith Crist said the film demonstrated "poetic and human detail". U.S. novelist Philip Roth was also an admirer of the film, writing in 1974 that "It's the first movie I've seen in years and years where I actually believed in the life and death of the characters. But the rendering of the settlement of the Midwest by immigrant Swedes and their dealings with the Indians and nature, is as good as anything in American literature on the subject", and it was an influence on some of his later work.

Roger Ebert referred to The New Land as a masterpiece in his review of Troell's Everlasting Moments (2008). In his 2015 Movie Guide, Leonard Maltin gave the film three and a half stars out of four, praising it for "Superior performances, photography, many stirring scenes". Author Terrence Rafferty wrote that The New Land appears lighter than The Emigrants, but has "a more pervasive sense of danger" and "disquiet", and compared Robert and Arvid to Lennie and George in John Steinbeck's Of Mice and Men. The 1974 American television series The New Land was based loosely on both The Emigrants and The New Land, which Rafferty attributed to the popularity of both films.

Accolades
The New Land was nominated for the Academy Award for Best Foreign Language Film in the same year Troell was nominated for Best Director for The Emigrants, the first time a director was nominated in those categories for two different films in the same year.

See also
List of submissions to the 45th Academy Awards for Best Foreign Language Film
List of Swedish submissions for the Academy Award for Best Foreign Language Film

References

Bibliography

External links

The Emigrants/The New Land: Homelands an essay by Terrence Rafferty at the Criterion Collection

Swedish drama films
1972 films
Swedish migration to North America
Swedish sequel films
Films based on Swedish novels
Films based on works by Vilhelm Moberg
Films about capital punishment
Films about immigration to the United States
Films about Native Americans
1970s Swedish-language films
Films directed by Jan Troell
Films set in the 19th century
Films set in Minnesota
Films shot in Minnesota
Films shot in Wisconsin
Works about Swedish-American culture
Best Foreign Language Film Golden Globe winners
Films based on multiple works of a series
1970s Swedish films
Foreign films set in the United States